Newport by-election may refer to one of three parliamentary by-elections held in the British House of Commons constituency of Newport in Monmouthshire, South Wales:

1922 Newport by-election
1945 Newport by-election
1956 Newport by-election

There is also an upcoming by-election for the modified constituency of Newport West (UK Parliament constituency) in 2019.

See also
Newport (Monmouthshire) (UK Parliament constituency)
List of United Kingdom by-elections